Mimocularia cineracea is a species of beetle in the family Cerambycidae, and the only species in the genus Mimocularia. It was described by Stephan von Breuning in 1970.

References

Ancylonotini
Beetles described in 1970
Monotypic beetle genera